Melvin Lorrel "Pete" Nichols (30 November 1894 – 29 March 1981) was an American chemistry professor and author.

Early life
Nichols was born in Dayton, Ohio, the son of Joseph Wiseman Nichols, a cabinetmaker, and Sarah Rebecca Heidelbaugh. He was the youngest of six children.

Career
Nichols was awarded his PhD from Cornell University in 1922. His thesis was “Dinitrosoresorcinol as a reagent for the quantitative determination of cobalt in the presence of nickel and other metals of the third group”.

He was awarded a Guggenheim Fellowship in Chemistry in 1929.

Nichols was on the faculty at Cornell University from 1923 to 1962, rising to become Emeritus Professor of Chemistry.

“Pete” Nichols' wrote two textbooks on analytical chemistry, Gas Analysis, co-authored with L.M. Dennis, and Laboratory Manual of Analytical Chemistry. In 1950, Pete Nichols agreed to become executive director of Cornell's Chemistry Department, a new position which involved supervision of the support facilities and the non-academic staff of what had become a large and complex establishment. He held this position until his retirement in 1962.

He died in California on 29 March 1981.

Personal life
He married Mary N Bancroft in 1926. They had one daughter, Sarah, "Sally".

References
  Cornell University 
  Genealogy
  Obituary

1894 births
1981 deaths
20th-century American chemists
Cornell University alumni
Cornell University faculty